At least two ships of the Hellenic Navy have borne the name Kriezis after Greek naval hero Antonios Kriezis:

 , a  launched in 1941 as HMS Coreopsis and transferred to Greece and renamed in 1943. She was scrapped in 1952.
 , a  launched in 1945 as USS Corry she was transferred to Greece in 1981 and renamed. She was scrapped in 2002.

Hellenic Navy ship names